Courage to Grow is the debut album by Rebelution, a reggae band from Santa Barbara, CA.  It was released on June 8, 2007, and reached the number 4 position in the Billboard Reggae Album chart.

Track listing

Credits 
Performers
Eric Rachmany – Vocals/Guitar
Matt Velasquez – Vocals/Guitar
Marley D. Williams – Bass
Wesley Finley – Drums
Rory Carey – Keyboards
Matt Lucca – Vocals/Guitar
Guest Performers
Kenny Bongos of SOJA – Percussion
Kelsey Howard – Trombone
Jim Passell – Trumpet
Gene Cornelius – Cello/Shakuhachi

References 

2007 debut albums
Rebelution (band) albums